Viktor Iosifovich Gordiyuk (born April 11, 1970) is a Russian former ice hockey right wing. He played 26 games in the National Hockey League with the Buffalo Sabres between 1992 and 1995. The rest of his career, which lasted from 1987 to 2010, was mainly spent in Russia. Internationally Gordiyuk played for the Soviet Union at several junior tournaments and at the 1991 Canada Cup.

Career
Gordiyuk was drafted in the seventh round, 142nd overall, by the Buffalo Sabres in the 1990 NHL Entry Draft.

Gordiyuk played six seasons in the Soviet Union with Krylya Sovetov Moscow before making his North American debut with the Sabres' American Hockey League affiliate, the Rochester Americans, in the 1992–93 season. He also appeared in sixteen National Hockey League games with Buffalo that season, scoring three goals and adding six assists.

Gordiyuk remained in the Sabres' organization for two more seasons, appearing in ten more games with Buffalo during the 1994–95 season and spending the remainder of the time in Rochester. After one season in the International Hockey League, Gordiyuk went to Germany for five seasons, playing in the Deutsche Eishockey Liga for Düsseldorfer EG.

Gordiyuk returned to his native Russia for the remainder of his career, retiring in 2010. In his NHL career, Gordiouk appeared in 26 games; he scored three goals and added eight assists.

Career statistics

Regular season and playoffs

International

External links

1970 births
Living people
Buffalo Sabres draft picks
Buffalo Sabres players
Düsseldorfer EG players
HC Dynamo Moscow players
HC Khimik Voskresensk players
HC Lada Togliatti players
HC MVD players
HC Spartak Moscow players
Krylya Sovetov Moscow players
Long Beach Ice Dogs (IHL) players
People from Odintsovo
Rochester Americans players
Russian ice hockey right wingers
Salavat Yulaev Ufa players
SKA Saint Petersburg players
Soviet ice hockey right wingers
Utah Grizzlies (IHL) players
Sportspeople from Moscow Oblast